Michael Kanfer is a visual effects artist who is best known for his work on Titanic and Apollo 13.

Oscars
Both of these are in the category of Best Visual Effects

68th Academy Awards-Nominated for Apollo 13. Nomination shared with Leslie Ekker, Robert Legato and Matt Sweeney. Lost to Babe.
70th Academy Awards-Titanic. Shared with Thomas L. Fisher, Mark Lasoff and Robert Legato. Won.

Selected filmography

Apollo 13 (1995)
Titanic (1997)
What Dreams May Come (1998)
Sky Captain and the World of Tomorrow (2004)

References

External links

Living people
Best Visual Effects Academy Award winners
Best Visual Effects BAFTA Award winners
Special effects people
Year of birth missing (living people)